Established in 1956, the Sportpark Sloten is a large sports complex located on the Riekerpolder at Sloterweg in Amsterdam - Sloten.
Surrounding the stadium is an asphalt cycling circuit, 2,5 km in length.

Stadia:
 The Velodrome Amsterdam, is one of only three covered Velodromes in the Netherlands, and played host to the annual Zesdaagse van Amsterdam (2001-2016)
 The gymnastics-hall Turnace.

Several sport clubs are tenants of the complex, such as:
 FC Blauw-Wit (since 1965), ZRC/Herenmarkt (since 1967, resp. 1994), Beursbengels and Nieuw Sloten (since 2004 each),
 American football-club Amsterdam Crusaders
 The Golf course Sloten.

References

External links 
 Stadsdeel Nieuw-West: Sportpark Sloten

Sports venues in Amsterdam
Football venues in the Netherlands
Blauw-Wit Amsterdam
1956 establishments in the Netherlands
Sports venues completed in 1956
American football venues in the Netherlands
Baseball in the Netherlands
Softball venues
Baseball venues in Europe
20th-century architecture in the Netherlands